General  Sir John Spink KH (1783 – 14 March 1877) was a British Army officer who became colonel of the 2nd (The Queen's Royal) Regiment of Foot.

Military career
Spink was commissioned as an ensign in the 12th Regiment of Foot on 2 September 1806. After seeing action in India between 1808 and 1809 during the Travancore Rebellion,  he led an attack on an enemy position on the island of Réunion in the Indian Ocean in 1810 and then took part in the Invasion of Isle de France also in the Indian Ocean and subsequent march on its capital, Port Louis, in November 1810 during the Napoleonic Wars.

He went on to be colonel of the 2nd (The Queen's Royal) Regiment of Foot from 28 May 1857 to his death in 1877. He was promoted full general in 1865

References

1783 births
1887 deaths
British Army generals
Suffolk Regiment officers
Military personnel from Yorkshire